The 24th Infantry Regiment was a unit of the United States Army, active from 1869 until 1951, and since 1995. Before its original dissolution in 1951, it was primarily made up of African-American soldiers.

History
The 24th Infantry Regiment (one of the Buffalo Soldier regiments) was organized on 1 November 1869 from the 38th U.S. (Colored) Infantry Regiment (formed 24 July 1866) and the 41st U.S. (Colored) Infantry Regiment (formed 27 July 1866). All the enlisted soldiers were black, either veterans of the U.S. Colored Troops or freedmen. From its activation until 1898, the 24th Infantry served throughout the Western United States. Its missions included garrisoning frontier posts, battling American Indians, protecting roadways against bandits, guarding the border between the United States and Mexico.

Medal of Honor: 
Wham Paymaster Robbery, Arizona Territory 11 May 1889
 Sergeant Benjamin Brown, Corporal Isaiah Mays
Black Seminole: United States Scouts, Canyon Blanco, Staked Plains, Texas (Red River War)
Private Adam Payne
Black Seminole: United States Scouts, Pecos Texas 25 April 1875
 Sergeant John Ward, trumpeter Isaac Payne, private Pompey Factor

Spanish–American War
The year 1898 saw the 24th Infantry deployed to Cuba as part of the U.S. Expeditionary Force in the Spanish–American War. Elements of the 24th participated in the storming of the Spanish fortress in the Battle of El Caney. At the climactic Battle of San Juan Hill under the command of Emerson H. Liscum, supported by intensive fire from the Gatling Gun Detachment, units of the 24th Infantry accompanied by elements of the 6th and 13th Infantry Regiments, assaulted and seized the Spanish-held blockhouse and trench system atop San Juan Hill.

Vancouver Barracks 
Company B arrived on 3 April 1899 at Vancouver Barracks – the first African American regiment to serve as part of the garrison there.

Philippine–American War

In 1899 the regiment deployed to the Philippine Islands to help suppress a guerrilla movement in the Philippine–American War. The regiment returned to the Islands in 1905, 1907, and 1911. Though the 24th fought a number of battles in the Philippines, one of the most notable occurred on 7 December 1899, when nine soldiers from the regiment routed 100 guerrillas from their trenches. Notable commanders during this period included Medal of Honor recipient Colonel Henry Blanchard Freeman and Colonel Charles L. Hodges, who commanded in the Philippines in 1907 and retired as a major general in 1911.

Mexican border
In 1916 the 24th Infantry guarded the Mexico–United States border to keep the Mexican Revolution from spilling onto U.S. soil. When it did, the 24th joined the "Punitive Expedition" under General Pershing and entered Mexico to fight Pancho Villa's forces. In 1919, rebels and troops of the Mexican government fought in Ciudad Juárez, Chihuahua, which borders the U.S. city of El Paso, Texas. The 24th Infantry crossed over again to engage the rebels, ensuring that no violence erupted across the U.S. border.

Pre-World War I and the Houston Riot
During the nadir of American race relations and just months after America's entry into World War I, the soldiers of this historic all-black unit had been dispatched to guard the construction of Camp Logan, a military facility in Harris County, where they met animosity from local white civilians.  When white police beat and arrested a black private who tried to intervene during a violent, daytime arrest of a black washer woman, the woman, Sarah Travers, and the soldier, Pvt Alonso Edwards, were jailed. A black corporal sent to inquire after the private, was pistol-whipped, chased and shot at, before being dragged out from under a bed and arrested. After untrue rumors of the corporal's murder spread to other soldiers, hostility boiled over.

The Houston Riot was a mutiny by 156 black soldiers of the 24th Infantry; it has been called the Camp Logan Riots. Sergeant Vida Henry of I Company, 3rd Battalion led about 150 black soldiers in a two-hour march on Houston because they had suffered racial discrimination in the city. The soldiers were met by local policemen and a great crowd of Houston residents, who had armed themselves. When the soldiers killed Captain J. W. Mattes of the Illinois National Guard (after mistaking him for a local policeman), the battalion fell into disarray. In their two-hour march on the city, the battalion killed 15 whites, some armed, including four policemen, a white child and seriously wounded 12 others, one of whom, a policeman, subsequently died. Five black soldiers were killed. Two were accidentally shot by their own men, one in camp and the other on San Felipe Street. The rioters were tried at three courts-martial. Nineteen men were executed by hanging, and 63 were given life sentences.

World War II
At the start of World War II, the 24th Infantry was stationed at Fort Benning as school troops for the Infantry School. They participated in the Carolina Maneuvers of October – December 1941. During World War II, the 24th Infantry fought in the South Pacific Theatre as a separate regiment. Deploying on 4 April 1942 from the San Francisco Port of Embarkation, the regiment arrived on Efate in the New Hebrides Islands on 4 May 1942. A Company was sent to Espirto Santo to clear jungle with the 
3rd Naval Construction Battalion Detachment building an airfield at Turtle Bay.  Another Company was sent to Nouméa to work with B Co. on CB 3 on Ile Nou.  First they worked on extending a Navy landing pier.  When that was done they assisted in pontoon assembly. The 24th moved to Guadalcanal on 28 August 1943, and was assigned to the XIV Corps. 1st Battalion deployed to Bougainville, attached to the 37th Infantry Division, from March to May 1944 for perimeter defense duty. The regiment departed Guadalcanal on 8 December 1944, and landed on Saipan and Tinian on 19 December 1944 for Garrison Duty that included mopping up the remaining Japanese forces that had yet to surrender. The regiment was assigned to the Pacific Ocean Area Command on 15 March 1945, and then to the Central Pacific Base Command on 15 May 1945, and to the Western pacific Base Command on 22 June 1945.

The regiment departed Saipan and Tinian on 9 July 1945, and arrived on the Kerama Islands off Okinawa on 29 July 1945. At the end of the war, the 24th took the surrender of forces on the island of Aka-shima, the first formal surrender of a Japanese Imperial Army garrison. The regiment remained on Okinawa through 1946.

Korean War
From the end of World War II through 1947, the 24th occupied Okinawa, Japan, after which it relocated to Gifu, Japan. On 1 February 1947, the regiment reorganized as a permanent regiment of the 25th Infantry Division. Despite the desegregation of the U.S. armed forces in 1948 by Executive Order 9981, the 24th Infantry remained predominantly African–American, with an officer corps of both African and European Americans. In late June 1950, soon after North Korea invaded South Korea, the 24th deployed to Korea to assist in the Korean War.

The 24th Infantry fought throughout the entire Korean peninsula, from the defense of the "Pusan Perimeter" to its breakout and the pursuit of the Korean People's Army (KPA) into North Korea, to the Chinese counteroffensives and finally to U.N. counteroffensives that stabilized near the current Korean Demilitarized Zone. The regiment received the Republic of Korea Presidential Unit Citation for its defense of the Pusan Perimeter. The regiment also had three posthumous Medal of Honor recipients: Cornelius H. Charlton, Ray E. Duke and William Thompson.

The cases of Lieutenant Leon Gilbert, court martialed for refusing an order from the 24th's commanding officer (who was white), and of some other members of the 24th, helped bring greater attention to problems of segregation and discrimination within the U.S. military.

The landing at Inchon by U.S. and ROK forces on 15 September finally compelled the KPA to withdraw from the Pusan Perimeter. The 24th Infantry was divided into Task Forces Blair and Corley (named for their commanders), and they, along with several from other commands, began pursuing the KPA on 27 September.

The 25th Division remained in South Korea until ordered north in late November to participate in the Home by Christmas offensive. Later in November, overwhelming assaults by Chinese People's Volunteer Army (PVA) troops forced the U.S. Eighth Army to withdraw. On 29 November, the Chinese 40th Army flanked the 24th Infantry's line north of the Chongchon River in North Korea, forcing the neighboring 9th Regiment, 2nd Division to withdraw.

On 30 November, the 3/24th was at Kunu-ri, on the division's open right flank, with PVA troops behind it. With the help of air support, the battalion extricated itself, losing one soldier killed, 30 wounded and 109 missing. Overall, the 24th Infantry lost one-fifth of its officers and one-third of its enlisted men in the withdrawal across the Chongchon. Colonel Corley blamed the disarray of the 3rd Battalion on its commander, Lt. Col. Melvin E. Blair, whom he summarily relieved.

The Eighth Army's withdrawal did not cease until the force was well below the 39th parallel north. But by early March 1951, the American and ROK troops were again ready for a full-scale offensive.

On 6 March, the 25th Division advanced across the Han River. The 1/24th did well, moving over difficult terrain against an entrenched enemy. The 3rd Battalion initially also performed well, executing a hastily devised river crossing and advancing through rough country against well dug-in PVA troops, far from the 1st Battalion. While climbing up steep terrain, however, the 1/24th reportedly collapsed under PVA fire and withdrew in disorder. When the Division commander learned of that action, his confidence in the 24th plummeted. Many soldiers of the 24th ran away from the fight, tossing their weapons and equipment aside. A derisive poem throughout the U.S. Army stated:
When them Chinese mortars begins to thud, the Old Deuce-Four begin to bug.

Although the 24th performed well in the attack north of the Han and the subsequent general withdrawal of the Eighth Army after the Chinese Spring Offensive of 1951, its reputation was somewhat tarnished. But it performed well in the Army's drive back north in May and June 1951.
In September 1950, the 24th's division commander, Gen. William B. Kean, requested that it be disbanded because it was "untrustworthy and incapable of carrying out missions expected of an infantry regiment."

In August, the regiment's new commander, Colonel Thomas D. Gillis, prodded by the Division commander, closely examined the 24th's record in Korea. Determining that leadership had been the problem, he relieved a number of officers. After the change in command, Company F conducted a valiant bayonet and grenade charge on 15 September. However the positive performance of Company F was ignored by higher commands and the news media. By 1 October 1951, the 24th was dissolved.

Modern legacy
The 24th Infantry was reactivated in 1995 and assigned to the 1st Brigade, 25th Infantry Division in Fort Lewis, Washington. The regiment served in the Iraq War from 2004 to 2005, and was decorated for its service. In 2006, during a re-organization of the Army, the regiment was re-flagged; however, the 1st Battalion was not included, and so it alone retains the regimental designation and carries on its legacy. It is now part of the 1st Brigade Combat Team, 11th Airborne Division at Fort Wainwright, Alaska.

Operation Iraqi Freedom
The 1st Battalion, 24th Infantry Regiment was assigned to the 1st Brigade, 25th Infantry Division "Lightning" (a Stryker brigade), and served in Iraq from October 2004 to October 2005. The battalion came home with 5 Silver Stars, 31 Bronze Stars, and 181 Purple Hearts and played a crucial role in the Battle of Mosul (2004). During that battle, the battalion saw some of the heaviest, sustained fighting of the insurgency to date. The unit was also awarded with the Valorous Unit Award as being part of the 1st Brigade, 25th Infantry Division (SBCT). The battalion commander during this deployment rotation was future United States Central Command (CENTCOM) Commander, General Michael "Erik" Kurilla.

The unit reflagged as the 3rd Squadron, 2nd Stryker Cavalry Regiment and moved to Vilseck, Germany. The 1st Battalion, 24th Infantry Regiment replaced the 2nd Battalion, 1st Infantry Regiment of the now decommissioned 172nd Stryker Brigade Combat Team as of 14 December 2006.

In 2008–2009, 1-24 Infantry deployed to Diyala Governorate, Iraq to FOB Warhorse and later to FOB Grizzly. In contrast to their previous deployment involving the Battle of Mosul, 1-24 sustained very few casualties, none of which came from sustained engagement with enemy forces. For their reconstruction and humanitarian efforts during this tour, the unit was awarded the Meritorious Unit Citation along with sister units in the 1st Brigade, 25th Infantry Division "Lightning".

Operation Enduring Freedom
The 1st Battalion, 24th Infantry Regiment deployed again under 1/25 SBCT to Afghanistan in support of Operation Enduring Freedom in 2011–2012. The battalion assumed responsibility for the Zabul Province, with assistance from Romanian units along Highway 1. The battalion HQ was primarily stationed at FOB Lagman in Zabul Province with companies co-located and dispersed north and south. 1-24 Infantry found themselves in a direct combat role again, losing several soldiers to Taliban attacks throughout their yearlong deployment, including an "insider attack" in Qalat on 8 January 2012.

Operation Inherent Resolve 
The 1st Battalion, 24th Infantry Regiment deployed once again to Iraq (and some elements later to Syria under U.S. Army Special Forces) under 1/25 SBCT in support of Operation Inherent Resolve in 2019-2020. The unit was attacked by ballistic missiles launched by Iran's Islamic Revolutionary Guard Corps Aerospace Force during their Operation Martyr Soleimani in retaliation for the Assassination of Qasem Soleimani.

Heraldry

Regimental badge

 Description:
 On a blue field a block house of masonry with tower, walls in color of grey stone, roofs yellow.
 On a yellow scroll, the words "SAN JUAN" in blue.
 All encircled by a yellow band bearing the motto in blue "SEMPER PARATUS" (Always Prepared).

 Symbolism: The design commemorates the gallant service of the regiment in the Santiago campaign of 1898.
 Background:
 The badge was approved on 1920-03-27.
 The badge is used as the crest on the organizational colors. The breast of the eagle on the colors is feathered.

Distinctive unit insignia
 Description:
 A gold color metal and enamel device  in width overall consisting of a blue disc bearing a white blockhouse with tower masoned and roofed gold below a gold scroll inscribed "SAN JUAN" in blue letters.
 Attached below the disc a gold scroll turned blue and inscribed "SEMPER PARATUS" in blue letters.

 Symbolism:
 Blue is the color associated with Infantry.
 The house with tower depicts a blockhouse at San Juan Santiago de Cuba and commemorates the 1898 campaign service of the regiment.

 Background:
 The distinctive unit insignia was originally approved for the 24th Infantry on 1923-01-21.
 It was amended to correct the motto on 1923-03-21.
 Amended to add the authorization for wear of the DUI on 1923-05-07.
 Amended to add to the authorization for wear of the DUI on 1925-09-21.
 On 1925-10-23 it was amended to change the appearance of the DUI.
 The insignia was cancelled and a new insignia authorized on 1927-05-17.

Lineage
Constituted 28 July 1866 in the Regular Army as the 38th Infantry Regiment
Organized 10 October 1866  at Jefferson Barracks, Missouri
Consolidated 15 March 1869 with the 41st Infantry Regiment, and consolidated unit redesignated as the 24th Infantry Regiment
Assigned 2 January 1947 to the 25th Infantry Division
Relieved 1 August 1951 from assignment to the 25th Infantry Division
Inactivated 1 October 1951 in Korea
Reorganized 16 August 1995 as a parent regiment under the U.S. Army Regimental System
Redesignated 1 October 2005 as the 24th Infantry Regiment
Inactivated on 1 June 2006 at Fort Lewis, Washington, and relieved from assignment to the 25th Infantry Division
 Assigned 16 December 2006 to the 1st Brigade Combat Team, 25th Infantry Division, and activated at Fort Wainwright, Alaska
 Assigned 6 June 2022 to 1st Infantry Brigade Combat Team, 11th Airborne Division after the reflagging of 1st Stryker Brigade Combat Team, 25th Infantry Division.

Honors

Campaign participation credit
 Indian Wars:
 Comanches
 Spanish–American War:
 Santiago
 Philippine–American War:
 San Isidro
 Luzon 1900
 World War II:
 Northern Solomons
 Western Pacific
 Korean War:
 UN Defensive
 UN Offensive
 CCF Intervention
 First UN Counteroffensive
 CCF Spring Offensive
 UN Summer-Fall Offensive

Decorations
 Korean Presidential Unit Citation for MASAN-CHINJU.
 Valorous Unit Award for Battle of Mosul.
 Meritorious Unit Citation for service during Operation Iraqi Freedom in 2008–2009 in Diyala Governorate.

Famous members
Special Forces Captain Harry G. Cramer, Jr. served most of his conventional career with 1st Battalion, 24th Infantry. He commanded Company B on Okinawa during the Occupation of Japan and commanded Companies B and D during the Korean War. He was considered the first Vietnam casualty from 1983 to 1999, is the first Special Forces soldier to die in Vietnam, and is the first casualty of the 1st Special Forces Group.
Oscar Charleston 1896-1954 (1911-1915) Major League Baseball Hall of Famer in 1976 (Considered the Best player of the Negro Major Leagues)
General Michael Kurilla, current CENTCOM Commander.

Notes 

24th Infantry Regiment (Buffalo Soldiers) US Army

External links

Index of Research Collection for the 24th Infantry Regiment at the United States Army Center of Military History
  Engagements by the Buffalo Soldiers and Seminole-Negro Indian Scouts

Buffalo Soldier units and formations
Military units and formations of the United States in the Indian Wars
024th Infantry Regiment
24th Infantry Regiment
024th Infantry Regiment
Military units and formations established in 1869
USInfReg0024
0024
1869 establishments in the United States
Infantry regiments of the United States Army in World War II